1. FC Kaiserslautern is a German football club based in Kaiserslautern, Rhineland-Palatinate.

Seasons

References
1. FC Kaiserslautern at worldfootball.net

Seasons
Kaiserslautern
German football club statistics